Mount Gravatt was an electoral district of the Legislative Assembly in the Australian state of Queensland from 1950 to 2009.

The district was based in the southern suburbs of Brisbane. Prior to its abolition, it included the suburbs of Mount Gravatt, Mount Gravatt East, Eight Mile Plains, Robertson and Sunnybank.

In 2008, Mount Gravatt was abolished—with effect at the 2009 state election—as a result of the redistribution undertaken by the Electoral Commission of Queensland. Its former territory and voters were divided between the districts of Chatsworth, Greenslopes, Mansfield, Yeerongpilly and the new seat of Sunnybank.

Members for Mount Gravatt

Election results

See also
 Electoral districts of Queensland
 Members of the Queensland Legislative Assembly by year
 :Category:Members of the Queensland Legislative Assembly by name

References

External links
 ABC profile

Former electoral districts of Queensland
1950 establishments in Australia
2009 disestablishments in Australia
Constituencies established in 1950
Constituencies disestablished in 2009